Filipe (25 March 1533 – 29 April 1539), was the Hereditary Prince of Portugal from 1537 to his death in 1539. He was the sixth child and third son of king John III of Portugal and Catherine of Austria.

In 1537, he succeeded his brother Prince Manuel as Prince of Portugal, after his premature death. 
After Philip's own premature death, two years later, after reaching six years old, his younger brother Infante João Manuel became the next Prince of Portugal.

Ancestry

References

House of Aviz
1533 births
1539 deaths
Princes of Portugal
Portuguese infantes
16th-century Portuguese people
People from Évora
Heirs apparent who never acceded
Children of John III of Portugal

Royalty and nobility who died as children